The 2014 French Open was a tennis tournament played on outdoor clay courts. It was the 118th edition of the French Open and the second Grand Slam event of the year. It took place at the Stade Roland Garros from 25 May to 8 June. It consisted of events for professional players in singles, doubles and mixed doubles play. Junior and wheelchair players also took part in singles and doubles events.

Rafael Nadal was the four-time defending champion in the men's singles and defeated Novak Djokovic in the men's singles final to win his 9th French Open title and his 14th Grand Slam title. The victory made Nadal the first tennis player to have won 5 consecutive French Open titles, in addition to becoming the only man with at least one Grand Slam title in 10 consecutive years.

Serena Williams was the defending women's singles champion. Williams failed to defend her title, losing to Garbiñe Muguruza in the second round. Maria Sharapova won the women's singles, defeating Simona Halep to win her second French Open title and her 5th Grand Slam title.

This was first time that both singles winners of the Australian Open (Li Na and Stanislas Wawrinka) lost in the first round of the French Open. Also, for the first time at any Grand Slam event in the Open era, the top three women's seeds (Williams, Li, and Agnieszka Radwańska) all failed to reach the fourth round.

Tournament

The 2014 French Open was the 113th edition of the French Open and was held at Stade Roland Garros in Paris.

The tournament is an event run by the International Tennis Federation (ITF) and is part of the 2014 ATP World Tour and the 2014 WTA Tour calendars under the Grand Slam category. The tournament consists of both men's and women's singles and doubles draws as well as a mixed doubles event. There is a singles and doubles events for both boys and girls (players under 18), which is part of the Grade A category of tournaments, and singles and doubles events for men's and women's wheelchair tennis players as part of the NEC tour under the Grand Slam category. The tournament is taking place over a series of twenty clay courts, including the three main showcourts, Court Philippe Chatrier, Court Suzanne Lenglen and Court 1.

Point and prize money distribution

Points distribution
Below is a series of tables for each of the competitions showing the ranking points on offer for each event.

Senior points

Wheelchair points

Junior points

Prize money
The total prize money for the tournament was €25,018,900, an increase of €3 million compared to the previous edition. The winners of the men's and women's singles title receive €1,650,000, an increase of 10% compared to 2013.

* per team

Singles players 
2014 French Open – Men's singles

2014 French Open – Women's singles

Day-by-day summaries

Singles seeds
The following are the seeded players and notable players who withdrew from the event. Seedings and Rankings are based on ATP and WTA rankings as of 19 May 2014, while points before are as of the standings on 26 May 2014.

Men's singles

The following player would have been seeded, but he withdrew from the event.

Women's singles

†The player did not qualify for the tournament in 2013. Accordingly, this was the 16th best result deducted instead.

The following player would have been seeded, but she withdrew from the event.

Main draw wildcard entries
The following players have been given a wildcard to the main draw based on internal selection and recent performances.

Men's Singles
  Robby Ginepri
  Pierre-Hugues Herbert
  Nick Kyrgios
  Michaël Llodra
  Paul-Henri Mathieu
  Axel Michon
  Albano Olivetti
  Lucas Pouille

Women's Singles
  Ashleigh Barty
  Fiona Ferro
  Claire Feuerstein
  Amandine Hesse
  Mathilde Johansson
  Alizé Lim
  Pauline Parmentier
  Taylor Townsend

Men's Doubles
 Mathias Bourgue /  Paul-Henri Mathieu
 Jonathan Eysseric /  Marc Gicquel
 Pierre-Hugues Herbert /  Albano Olivetti
 Tristan Lamasine /  Laurent Lokoli
 Fabrice Martin /  Hugo Nys
 Gaël Monfils /  Josselin Ouanna
 Florent Serra /  Maxime Teixeira

Women's Doubles
 Mona Barthel /  Virginie Razzano
 Julie Coin /  Pauline Parmentier
 Alix Collombon /  Chloé Paquet
 Claire Feuerstein /  Alizé Lim
 Stéphanie Foretz Gacon /  Laura Thorpe
 Amandine Hesse /  Mathilde Johansson
 Irina Ramialison /  Constance Sibille

Mixed Doubles
 Julie Coin /  Nicolas Mahut
 Alizé Cornet /  Jonathan Eysseric
 Stéphanie Foretz Gacon /  Édouard Roger-Vasselin
 Amandine Hesse /  Michaël Llodra
 Mathilde Johansson /  Adrian Mannarino
 Alizé Lim /  Jérémy Chardy

Main draw qualifiers

Men's singles

  Paolo Lorenzi
  Peter Polansky
  Laurent Lokoli
  James Ward
  Ante Pavić
  Andreas Haider-Maurer
  Miloslav Mečíř Jr.
  Diego Schwartzman
  Simone Bolelli
  Damir Džumhur
  Facundo Bagnis
  Gastão Elias
  Andreas Beck
  Andrea Arnaboldi
  James Duckworth
  Potito Starace

Women's singles

  Grace Min
  Heather Watson
  Maryna Zanevska
  Yuliya Beygelzimer
  Danka Kovinić
  Aleksandra Wozniak
  Kiki Bertens
  Ksenia Pervak
  Timea Bacsinszky
  Sofia Shapatava
  Michelle Larcher de Brito
  Tamira Paszek

Protected ranking
The following players were accepted directly into the main draw using a protected ranking:

Men's Singles
  Pablo Cuevas (PR 54)
  Jürgen Zopp (PR 88)

Women's Singles
  Iveta Melzer (PR 67)

Withdrawals 
The following players were accepted directly into the main tournament, but withdrew with injuries.

Men's Singles
 Juan Martín del Potro → replaced by  Facundo Argüello
 Florian Mayer → replaced by  Thomaz Bellucci
 Janko Tipsarević → replaced by  David Goffin

Women's Singles
 Victoria Azarenka → replaced by  Anna-Lena Friedsam
 Jamie Hampton → replaced by  Petra Martić
 Bethanie Mattek-Sands → replaced by  Mandy Minella
 Laura Robson → replaced by  Shelby Rogers
 Galina Voskoboeva → replaced by  Estrella Cabeza Candela

Champions

Seniors

Men's singles

  Rafael Nadal defeated   Novak Djokovic, 3–6, 7–5, 6–2, 6–4
• It was Nadal's 14th career Grand Slam title and his 9th title at the French Open (a record). He is on his sixty-fourth career title overall.

Women's singles

  Maria Sharapova defeated  Simona Halep, 6–4, 6–7(5–7), 6–4
• It was Sharapova's 5th career Grand Slam title and her 2nd title at the French Open.

Men's doubles

  Julien Benneteau /  Édouard Roger-Vasselin defeated  Marcel Granollers /  Marc López, 6–3, 7–6(7–1)
• It was Benneteau's 1st career Grand Slam doubles title.
• It was Vasselin's 1st career Grand Slam doubles title.

Women's doubles

  Hsieh Su-wei /  Peng Shuai defeated  Sara Errani /  Roberta Vinci, 6–4, 6–1
• It was Hsieh's 2nd career Grand Slam doubles title and her 1st title at the French Open.
• It was Peng's 2nd career Grand Slam doubles title and her 1st title at the French Open.

Mixed doubles

  Anna-Lena Grönefeld /  Jean-Julien Rojer defeated  Julia Görges /  Nenad Zimonjić, 4–6, 6–2, [10–7]
• It was Grönefeld's 2nd career Grand Slam mixed doubles title and her 1st title at the French Open.
• It was Rojer's 1st career Grand Slam mixed doubles title.

Juniors

Boys' singles

  Andrey Rublev defeated  Jaume Antoni Munar Clar, 6–2, 7–5

Girls' singles

  Daria Kasatkina defeated  Ivana Jorović, 6–7(5–7), 6–2, 6–3

Boys' doubles

  Benjamin Bonzi /  Quentin Halys defeated  Lucas Miedler /  Akira Santillan, 6–3, 6–3

Girls' doubles

  Ioana Ducu /  Ioana Loredana Roșca defeated  CiCi Bellis /  Markéta Vondroušová, 6–1, 5–7, [11–9]

Wheelchair events

Wheelchair men's singles

  Shingo Kunieda defeated  Stéphane Houdet, 6–4, 6–1

Wheelchair women's singles

 Yui Kamiji defeated  Aniek van Koot, 7–6(9–7), 6–4

Wheelchair men's doubles

  Joachim Gérard /  Stéphane Houdet defeated  Gustavo Fernández /  Nicolas Peifer, 4–6, 6–3, [11–9]

Wheelchair women's doubles

  Yui Kamiji /  Jordanne Whiley defeated  Jiske Griffioen /  Aniek van Koot, 7–6(7–3), 3–6, [10–8]

Other events

Legends under 45 doubles

  Mansour Bahrami /  Fabrice Santoro defeated  Arnaud Clément /  Nicolas Escudé, 6–2, 2–6, [11–9]

Legends over 45 doubles

  John McEnroe /  Patrick McEnroe defeated  Andrés Gómez /  Mark Woodforde, 4–6, 7–5, [10–7]

Women's legends doubles

  Kim Clijsters /  Martina Navratilova defeated  Nathalie Dechy /  Sandrine Testud, 5–7, 7–5, [10–7]

References

External links

 Official website
 Players' Guide 2014 (PDF)